Governor Coddington may refer to:

William Coddington Jr. (1651–1689), Governor of the Colony of Rhode Island and Providence Plantations from 1683 to 1685
William Coddington (1601–1678), 1st Governor of Newport and Portsmouth from 1651 to 1653, and later Governor of the Colony of Rhode Island and Providence Plantations